Zvonimir Mikulić (born 5 February 1990) is a Croatian professional footballer who plays as a goalkeeper for Hebar Pazardzhik.

Club career
Mikulić spent, as of 2015, his entire career, both youth and senior, at his hometown club NK Osijek, apart from two loan spells, half a season at the third-tier NK Olimpija Osijek in 2009 and the 2010–11 season at the second-tier HNK Vukovar '91. An understudy to Ivan Kardum and Ivan Vargić, Mikulić made his Prva HNL debut aged 22, in a home 5–0 win against NK Zadar on 12 May 2012. He became the first choice goalkeeper at his club after Vargić left for HNK Rijeka, at the beginning of 2013.

Personal life
Mikulić is a student at the Faculty of Economics in the University of Osijek, and hopes to finish his studies after his career is over.

Honours
Sheriff Tiraspol
Moldovan National Division: 2017, 2018, 2019
Moldovan Cup: 2018–19

References

External links
 
 

1990 births
Living people
Sportspeople from Osijek
Association football goalkeepers
Croatian footballers
NK Osijek players
NK Olimpija Osijek players
HNK Vukovar '91 players
FC Sheriff Tiraspol players
PFC Levski Sofia players
Tuzlaspor players
FC Brașov (2021) players
Croatian Football League players
Moldovan Super Liga players
First Professional Football League (Bulgaria) players
TFF First League players
Liga II players
Croatian expatriate footballers
Expatriate footballers in Moldova
Expatriate footballers in Bulgaria
Expatriate footballers in Turkey
Expatriate footballers in Romania
Croatian expatriate sportspeople in Moldova
Croatian expatriate sportspeople in Bulgaria
Croatian expatriate sportspeople in Turkey
Croatian expatriate sportspeople in Romania